The Crystal Simorgh for Best Actor is an award presented annually by the Fajr Film Festival.

Winners and nominees

References 

Crystal Simorgh for Best Actor winners